Hirson is a surname. Notable people with the surname include:

Alice Hirson (born 1929), American actress
Baruch Hirson (1921–1999), South African activist and historian
David Hirson (born 1958), American dramatist
Roger O. Hirson (1926–2019), American dramatist and screenwriter

See also
Saša Hiršzon (born 1972), Yugoslavian/Croatian tennis player